Amboasary may refer to places in Madagascar:

Amboasary-Antambolo, in Itasy
Amboasary Sud, a town in Anosy
Amboasary Gara, a town near Moramanga, in Alaotra-Mangoro
Amboasary river, a river in Alaotra-Mangoro
Amboasary Nord, a town in Ankazobe District in Analamanga, Madagascar
 Amboasary, Atsinanana, a rural municipality in Marolambo District, Atsinanana